Heartland is a 1979 American film, directed by Richard Pearce, starring Rip Torn and Conchata Ferrell. The film is a stark depiction of early homestead life in the American West. It is based on a memoir by Elinore Pruitt Stewart, titled Letters of a Woman Homesteader (1914).

Plot
In 1910 Wyoming, a widow and her seven-year old daughter travel by train to two great unknowns-a strange land and life in a remote frontier with a man they never met.

Production
Set in southwestern Wyoming, where Stewart homesteaded, the movie was filmed in central Montana.

The soundtrack features New Orleans clarinetist George Lewis playing the hymn "What a Friend We Have in Jesus."

Reception
In 1980, the film was featured as a "Buried Treasure" (a film that received little attention during its initial run)  by film critics Roger Ebert and Gene Siskel on an episode of the TV show, Sneak Previews, (the latter put the film as one of the best films of 1981).

Cast
 Rip Torn as Clyde Stewart
 Conchata Ferrell as Elinore Randall Stewart
 Barry Primus as Jack
 Megan Folsom as Jerrine
 Lilia Skala as Mrs. Landauer
 Amy Wright as Clara Jane
 Jerry Hardin as Cattlebuyer
 Mary Boylan as Ma Gillis
 Jeff Boschee as Land Office Agent #1
 Robert Overholzer as Land Office Agent #2
 Bob Sirucek as Dan Byrd
 Marvin Berg as Justice of the Peace
 Gary Voldseth as Cowboy
 Mike Robertson as Cowboy
 Doug Johnson as Cowboy

Awards
In 1980, the film shared the Golden Bear award for Best Film at the 30th Berlin International Film Festival, and  one year later on the Top Ten Films from National Board of Review alongside cinematic heavyweights like Academy Award for Best Picture winner Chariots of Fire and the Steven Spielberg blockbuster Indiana Jones and the Raiders of the Lost Ark.

See also
 Elinore Pruitt Stewart Homestead, Wyoming, listed on the U.S. National Register of Historic Places
 American Midwest
Days of Heaven, the 1978 Terrence Malick film similar in content

References

External links

 

1979 films
Films set in the 1910s
Films set in Wyoming
Films shot in Montana
Golden Bear winners
1979 drama films
Films directed by Richard Pearce
American drama films
American Playhouse
1970s English-language films
1970s American films